József Nagy (born 8 September 1934) is a Hungarian boxer. He competed in the men's bantamweight event at the 1960 Summer Olympics.

References

1934 births
Living people
Hungarian male boxers
Olympic boxers of Hungary
Boxers at the 1960 Summer Olympics
Martial artists from Budapest
Bantamweight boxers